The Saksahan is a river in Ukraine, in the southeastern part of the Dnieper Upland. It is a left tributary of the Inhulets (Dnieper basin), joining the Inhulets in the city of Kryvyi Rih.

The name is derived, according to some sources, from the Turkic word Saxagan (magpie).

The source of the river, in the modern territorial division, located by the village of Malooleksandrivka, Verkhnodniprovsk Raion, situated at an altitude of 140 meters above sea level. The river (river basin) is 144 km long (according to other sources, it has a total length of 130 kilometers). The width of the river bed is an average of 5–15 meters, plёsah places expands to 20–40 (29 to 40) meters (watershed line - 250 km).

Rivers of Kryvyi Rih
Rivers of Dnipropetrovsk Oblast